The Boston College Eagles football team represents Boston College in the sport of American football. The Eagles compete in the NCAA Division I Football Bowl Subdivision (FBS) of the National Collegiate Athletic Association (NCAA) as a member of the Atlantic Division of the Atlantic Coast Conference (ACC). The Eagles home games are played at Alumni Stadium on the university's campus in Chestnut Hill, Massachusetts. 

Formed in 1892, Boston College has won four Eastern championships in 1940, 1942, 1983, and 1984 (when most Division I FBS schools in the Northeast and Mid-Atlantic regions remained independent) as well as one co–Big East championship in 2004. BC claims one national championship in 1940, though the NCAA doesn't recognize it. The program has amassed over 650 wins, and has a 14–13 record in postseason bowl games, most notably the 1941 Sugar Bowl and 1985 Cotton Bowl. Boston College has produced a Heisman Trophy winner (Doug Flutie in 1984), 13 consensus All-Americans, and over 200 NFL players. Boston College has had 8 members inducted into the College Football Hall of Fame, and two inductees into the Pro Football Hall of Fame: Art Donovan and Ernie Stautner.

Boston College is one of only two Catholic universities that field a team in the Football Bowl Subdivision, the other being Notre Dame. In addition to success on the gridiron, Boston College football teams are consistently ranked among the nation's best for academic achievement and graduation. In 2005, 2006, and 2007, the football team's Academic Progress Rate was the highest of any school that finished the season ranked in the AP or ESPN/USA Today Coaches' polls.

Boston College is the only FBS school in Massachusetts (as well as New England) to compete in one of the Power Five conferences. The Eagles are currently coached by Jeff Hafley, who formerly served as co-defensive coordinator at Ohio State.

History

Early history (1893–1967)

In 1892, Boston College President Edward Ignatius Devitt, S.J., grudgingly agreed to the requests of two undergraduates, Joseph F. O'Connell of the class of 1893 and Joseph Drum of the class of 1894, to start a varsity football team. Drum would become the first head coach, albeit an unpaid position and O'Connell was captain. On October 26, 1893, BC played its first official game against the St. John's Literary Institute of Cambridge followed by its first intercollegiate game against MIT. BC won the first game 4–0, but lost 6–0 to MIT. Some of the original team's alumni had particularly significant careers: Joseph F. O'Connell was elected to the U.S. House of Representatives from Massachusetts, and running back James Carlin became president of the College of the Holy Cross.

In 1920, the Boston College football team adopted the nickname 'Eagles.' The season was capped by a stirring 14-0 victory over Holy Cross before 40,000 fans at Braves Field. The win gave the team a perfect 8-0 season and the school’s first 'Eastern Championship.'

The 1939 team finished the regular season with a 9–1 record, and the Eagles were ranked in the final AP Poll for the first time in school history, at No. 11. They were invited to the school's first bowl game, the 1940 Cotton Bowl, where they were defeated by Clemson 3–6.

The 1940 season can arguably be called the greatest year in the history of Boston College football. BC's undefeated (11–0) and untied team, captured the 1941 Sugar Bowl championship and earned the nickname "Team of Destiny". Five members of that storied team have been inducted into the National Football Foundation's College Football Hall of Fame: receiver Gene Goodreault (50); guard George Kerr (47); center Chet Gladchuk (45); fullback Mike Holovak (12); and halfback / quarterback Charlie O'Rourke (13). It included a 19–18 victory over No. 9 Georgetown before 41,700 fans at sold-out Fenway Park, that was called one of the greatest games ever by famed sportswriter Grantland Rice. Going into the game, the Hoyas had 22 consecutive victories spanning three seasons. BC trailed until the third quarter, when a 43-yard touchdown pass from Charlie O'Rourke to Monk Maznicki put the Eagles ahead. With just seconds remaining, BC had the ball on their own nine, fourth down and 18 to go. Georgetown set up to return the Eagles' punt. Instead of punting, O'Rourke scrambled in his own end zone for 45 seconds then took a safety. BC used the free kick to boot the ball far downfield and dashed the Hoyas' three-season unbeaten record. Legendary Coach Frank Leahy, who would go on to cement his legendary status during an eleven-year stint as head coach at Notre Dame, took his undefeated Eagles on to the Sugar Bowl in New Orleans where they beat No. 4 Tennessee 19–13. Trailing 7–13 in the fourth quarter, Tennessee's Bob Foxx missed a short field goal attempt with three minutes remaining, and Boston College took over on its own 20–yard line. Quarterback Charlie O'Rourke led the Eagles on an eighty-yard drive, capped with his 24-yard touchdown run to seal the victory. A banner on campus commemorating the team uses the phrase "national champions", but Boston College was not awarded a national championship by any of the national polls at the time of the 1940 season. Although BC's claim to a title is not recognized by the NCAA or college football historians in general, one website, the College Football Data Warehouse, claims that selectors named Cliff Morgan and Ray Bryne rated BC No. 1 in 1940. This web site states that BC's historic 1940 run resulted in a split championship with the University of Minnesota, but it's not clear whether the selectors awarded BC a title at the time of the 1940 season, or if they did so retroactively. The NCAA lists only Minnesota (who finished No. 1 the final AP Poll) as the national champion in 1940, and does not credit Boston College with any national championships in football. 

In 1942, Boston College won its first 8 games of the season, climbing to No. 1 in the AP Poll. All the Eagles needed to do to secure its first ever AP national championship was to beat rival Holy Cross (4–4–1) in the final game of the regular season. The result, however, was a stunning rout loss, 12–55. The Eagles team canceled their planned post-game celebration at the Cocoanut Grove nightclub in Boston, which inadvertently saved the team from perishing along with 492 others in the Cocoanut Grove fire that occurred that night. Finishing No. 8 in the final AP rankings, the Eagles received an invitation to play in the Orange Bowl on New Year's Day. All-American fullback Mike Holovak scored three rushing touchdowns, but Boston College ultimately lost to No. 10 Alabama, 21–37.

Mike Holovak was named head coach of BC in 1951. During his tenure as head coach, the Eagles compiled a 49–29–3 record. Holovak won Coach of the Year honors in 1954 from New England football writers. Those efforts were good enough to earn him a new four-year contract on November 22, 1955, but even after four more winning seasons - he was fired on December 3, 1959, after a year in which Eagle fans had subjected him to constant verbal abuse. Holovak would move on to coach the Boston Patriots in the upstart American Football League (AFL) from 1961–1968.

Ernie Hefferle, an assistant coach for the NFL's Washington Redskins, was hired as head coach of the Eagles following Holovak's firing. Hefferle's Eagles compiled a record of 7–12–1 in two seasons. However, mounting pressure to win from the alumni and administration led to Hefferle's resignation after the 1961 season. BC hired Jim Miller away from Detroit as its head coach in January 1962. Under Miller, the Eagles compiled a record of 34–24 that included four winning seasons in those six years. Miller resigned after the 1967 season.

Joe Yukica era (1968–1977)
New Hampshire head coach Joe Yukica was hired to replace Miller at BC. Yukica's Eagles compiled a 68–37 record, which included eight winning seasons. Yukica left BC after the 1977 season to accept the head football coach position at Dartmouth. One of the highlights during Yukica 's tenure was an upset win over No. 7 Texas to open the 1976 season.

Ed Chlebek era (1978–1980)
The Eagles hired Ed Chlebek away from Eastern Michigan to lead its football program in January 1978. Despite a dismal 0–11 record in Chlebek's first season, BC rebounded to compile a 5–6 record in 1979 and a 7–4 record in 1980, leading to a job offer from Kent State to Chlebek, which he accepted. Chlebek's final record at BC is 12–21.

Jack Bicknell era (1981–1990)

Jack Bicknell was hired as BC's head coach after previously serving as head coach at Maine. The best player for the Eagles during Bicknell's tenure was quarterback Doug Flutie (of Natick, Massachusetts), who played for Boston College from 1981 to 1984. Flutie won the Heisman Trophy in his senior year. He gained national attention on November 23, 1984, when he led the Eagles to victory in a high-scoring, back-and-forth game against defending national champion Miami Hurricanes (led by star QB Bernie Kosar) in the Orange Bowl. The game was nationally televised on CBS the day after Thanksgiving, and had a huge audience. Miami staged a dramatic drive to take the lead, 45–41, in the closing minute of the game. Boston College then took possession at their own 22-yard line with 28 seconds to go. After two passes moved the ball another 30 yards, only six seconds remained on the clock. On the last play of the game, Flutie rolled out right away from the defense and threw a Hail Mary pass that was caught in the end zone by senior wideout Gerard Phelan, giving BC a miraculous 47–45 win. A persistent urban legend holds that this play essentially clinched the Heisman Trophy, the award given to the best player in college football that year, for Flutie; in fact, the Heisman voting was already complete by the day of the game. It has been called "the greatest moment in college football." In November 2008, Doug Flutie was honored by Boston College with a statue of his famous "Hail Mary" pass.

The Eagles completed the 1984 season with a 10–2 record, finishing at No. 5 in the AP Poll and No. 4 in the Coaches' Poll. They defeated the  SWC champion Houston Cougars in the 1985 Cotton Bowl, 45–28. Fullback Steve Strachan (from Burlington, Massachusetts) was named the game's MVP. He had 23 carries for 91 yards and two touchdowns.

Bicknell's final record at Boston College was 59–55–1, took the Eagles to four bowl games, and won the Lambert-Meadowlands Trophy (awarded to 'Eastern champion' in Division I FBS) twice: 1983 and 1984. He was fired after the 1990 season.

Tom Coughlin era (1991–1993)

Tom Coughlin, wide receivers coach for the NFL's New York Giants and former BC quarterbacks coach (1981–83), was hired as BC's head coach after Bicknell was fired. Coughlin's Eagles compiled a record of 21–13–1. The highlight of Coughlin's tenure was a 41–39 Eagles victory over No. 1 Notre Dame in 1993, the first time the Eagles had ever defeated the powerhouse Irish and the first and only time in program history that the Eagles had defeated a No. 1 team. Coughlin, who left BC for the NFL's Jacksonville Jaguars, would go on to become head coach of the New York Giants, winning two Super Bowls: XLII, XLVI (both against the New England Patriots).

Dan Henning era (1994–1996)
BC hired Dan Henning, formerly offensive coordinator for the NFL's Detroit Lions, as its head coach in March 1994. Henning's tenure is remembered for a scandal that occurred during the 1996 season. On October 26, 1996, the Eagles were routed 45–17 by Syracuse.  Following the game, head coach Dan Henning got word that several players may have bet against their own team in that game.  No one came forward.  After the Eagles lost a close game to Pittsburgh a week later, an irate Henning demanded that anyone involved in gambling come forward.  He also notified school officials of his suspicions.  The resulting inquiry resulted in the suspension of 13 players for the final three games of the season, and eight of them never played another down for the Eagles again. As a result of the scandal and a mediocre 16–19–1 record as coach, Henning resigned at the end of the 1996 season.

Tom O'Brien era (1997–2006)
In December 1996, BC hired a 1971 Navy graduate and the former Virginia offensive coordinator Tom O'Brien. O'Brien arrived at The Heights with plans to revive the program after the team had been tarnished in the wake of the scandal. With good recruiting skills and a strong coaching staff around him, notably offensive coordinator Dana Bible and defensive coordinator Frank Spaziani, O'Brien turned the program into a consistent top-25 team. The team was also helped by increased exposure on the national stage due to the move to the ACC and, later, improved facilities in the form of the Yawkey Center.

Following two mediocre seasons in 1997 (4-7) and 1998 (4-7), O'Brien's vision of a re-built football program began to take shape. In 1999, the Eagles finished the regular season 8–3 including a 31–29 win at Notre Dame Stadium on November 20. BC had earned itself its first bowl berth since being ensnarled in the 1996 gambling scandal. Despite the excitement of its first postseason game in five years, Boston College laid an egg at the Insight.com Bowl in Tucson, Arizona, getting squashed by the University of Colorado, 62–28. In 2000 BC finished the regular season at 6–5 with just enough wins to be bowl-eligible and found themselves in Honolulu for the Aloha Bowl where they downed Arizona State 31–17, giving O'Brien his first bowl victory as head coach.

The year 2001 saw Boston College end a 21-game losing streak to ranked opponents when, in the Music City Bowl, the Eagles beat No. 16 Georgia 20–16 to finish at 8–5. But the most memorable moment of the year came in another thrilling game against then-No. 1 Miami at Alumni Stadium. Trailing 12–7 BC stood at the Hurricanes 9-yard-line, poised to win with just over 20 seconds left in the contest, but an interception thrown by Eagles quarterback Brian St. Pierre cost the game. St. Pierre threw too low for receiver Ryan Read, and the pass ricocheted off a Miami defender's leg and fell into the hands of defensive end Matt Walters. After a short return, Walters handed the ball off to defensive back Ed Reed, who returned it the remaining 80 yards for a touchdown—preserving a win for the Hurricanes and keeping their hopes alive for a national championship, which eventually won. Despite the defeat, the season had several highs including running back William Green rushing for 1,559 yards and being the top RB taken in the 2002 NFL Draft; eight wins for the first time since 1993; and finishing the season ranked (No. 21) for the first time since 1994.

Over the next few years the team posted respectable win–loss records and continued to win bowl games. In 2002, BC went 9–4 and won the Motor City Bowl, in 2003 they were 8–5 with a victory in the San Francisco Bowl and finished 9–3 in 2004 with a win in the Continental Tire Bowl. The year 2004 would be the Eagles final campaign in the Big East, and it finished the season in a four-way tie atop the league after losing the home finale to Syracuse (thus costing the Eagles a coveted berth in a BCS bowl) — a year in which they closed the season ranked No. 21 in both major polls. On December 6, 2006, O'Brien decided to leave the Eagles and replace Chuck Amato as head coach at NC State.

Jeff Jagodzinski era (2007–2008)

O'Brien was replaced by then Green Bay Packers offensive coordinator Jeff Jagodzinski. In Jagodzinski's first year, the Eagles were picked to finish 2nd in the Atlantic in the ACC Preseason Poll. The Eagles raced out to a 7–0 start behind the arm of Matt Ryan and a stout, senior-laden defense. The Eagles climbed to No. 2 in the BCS Standings before squaring off against No. 8 Virginia Tech on a rainy night at Lane Stadium. The Eagles struggled on offense all night and trailed the Hokies 10–0 late in the 4th quarter. In a miraculous comeback, Ryan threw two touchdown passes in the final 2:11 of game to give BC the victory. Ryan's second touchdown pass, a 24-yard tear-drop pass to a wide open Andre Callender in the back of the end zone, caused ESPN's Chris Fowler to exclaim "Lane Stadium goes silent!" The come-back win vaulted Ryan into the Heisman discussion. BC clinched the ACC Atlantic Division with yet another dramatic win, this time over rival Clemson. Matt Ryan was once again the hero, finding a wide-open Rich Gunnell for a 43-yard TD pass with 1:46 to go to give the Eagles the 20–17 lead. Clemson's 54-yard FG attempt to tie the game fell short, clinching the victory for Boston College. The Eagles eventually lost the ACC Championship Game to the Hokies. BC played in the Champs Sports Bowl against the Michigan State Spartans, winning 24–21. 2007 marked the second time in Eagle history that the team won 11 games, the other being the undefeated 1940 season. Matt Ryan won the Manning Award and the Johnny Unitas Golden Arm Award, becoming BC's first major award recipient since Mike Ruth won the Outland Trophy in 1985. Ryan finished 7th in the Heisman race, garnering 9 first place votes. Jamie Silva was a Consensus All-American, BC's first since William Green in 2001. The 2008 season saw the Eagles return to the ACC Championship Game, this time behind a defense that ranked 5th in Total Defense. The Eagles fell once again to the Hokies. In both 2007 and 2008, the Eagles had defeated the Hokies in the regular season meeting only to lose in the ACC Championship Game. Following the 2008 season, Jagodzinski was fired for interviewing with the New York Jets.

Frank Spaziani era (2009–2012)

Frank Spaziani, promoted from defensive coordinator of the Eagles, was hired as BC's head coach in January 2009. Prior to the 2009 season, star LB and reigning ACC Defensive Player of the Year Mark Herzlich was diagnosed with Ewing's Sarcoma, a rare form of bone cancer. Herzlich was forced to miss the entirety of the 2009 season. Herzlich became an inspirational figure as he battled his way back, earning the Disney's Wide World of Sports Spirit Award, an award presented annually to college football's most inspirational player or team. Boston College created a chapter of Uplifting Athletes to benefit Ewing's Sarcoma research. The chapter participates in an annual "Lift for Life" (where players compete in various physical challenges) to raise money. On October 3, 2009, Herzlich publicly announced on College Gameday that he was cancer-free. Herzlich completed the comeback when he took the field once again on September 4, 2010, against Weber State.

It was announced on December 1, 2009, that the Boston College football team, along with 29 other athletic programs on campus, would officially switch its athletic outfitter from Reebok to Under Armour. On July 1, 2010, BC became the tenth Football Bowl Subdivision team to wear uniforms from the Baltimore-based outfitter, joining Auburn, Hawaii, Maryland, North Texas, South Carolina, South Florida, Texas Tech and Utah.

In 2011, the Eagles finished 4–8 and failed to qualify for a bowl for the first time in 12 years. Following the 2011 season, junior LB Luke Kuechly won the Butkus Award, the Lombardi Award, the Lott Trophy, and the Bronko Nagurski Trophy. Kuechly is the first Eagle to win these awards. Offensive Coordinator Doug Martin was brought in by head coach Frank Spaziani prior to the beginning of the 2012 season, but upon finishing 2-10 Spaziani was fired.

Steve Addazio era (2013–2019)
Spaziani was replaced by Temple head coach Steve Addazio.
In 2013, Coach Addazio led the Eagles to an impressive turnaround season, finishing the regular season bowl-eligible with a 7–5 record. Senior running-back Andre Williams became only the 16th player in NCAA history to run for over 2,000 yards, winning the Doak Walker Award and finishing 4th in the Heisman Trophy voting. He was named a unanimous All-American. In addition, he was a unanimous first team All-ACC selection and a finalist for the Walter Camp Award. Williams set multiple school records, breaking nearly every single-season rushing record and many career-rushing records but also included the single-game rushing record at 339 yards against NC State as well as tying the single-game scoring record at 5 rushing TD's in a game against Army. The Eagles played the Arizona Wildcats in the 2013 Independence Bowl, losing by a score of 42–19 to finish the season at 7–6 (4–4 ACC). Andre Williams finished with 2,177 yards rushed on the season, good for 5th most all-time in the NCAA.

In his second year, Addazio led the Eagles to a consecutive 7–5 regular season, their second bowl-eligible season in as many years. With many key players having graduated, including Heisman finalist Andre Williams, quarterback Chase Rettig, wide receiver Alex Amidon, and linebacker Kevin Pierre-Louis, Addazio helped replace some lost production with graduate transfer quarterback Tyler Murphy, who was recruited by Addazio at Florida, as well as converting backup quarterback Josh Bordner to the wide receiver position. The running back core went from a single back (Williams) to a group of five threats: sophomores Myles Willis and Tyler Rouse, true freshman Jonathan Hilliman and Sherm Allston, as well as Tyler Murphy himself, who was more dangerous with his legs than his arm during the season. Murphy finished the season leading all quarterbacks in the league with 1,184 yards rushing, breaking the school record for most rushing yards by a quarterback, previously held by Doug Flutie. The season was highlighted by a historic upset victory over 9th ranked USC, in which Murphy rushed for 191 yards in the 37–31 victory. The Eagles nearly managed another two upsets against Clemson and Florida State, but came up just short in both games. Boston College played Penn State in the 2014 Pinstripe Bowl and lost in overtime 31–30. The Eagles scored first in overtime, yet missed the PAT, while the Nittany Lions scored on their possession and made their PAT. Boston College finished the season 7–6 (4–4 ACC). The Eagles fell on hard times in Addazio's third season, finishing with an overall record of 3-9 and a winless 0-8 ACC record. The Eagles would also go 0-18 in Basketball during ACC play, the first time since 1976 that a Power Five conferences program went winless in both basketball and football. However, despite their subpar record, the Eagles boasted the No. 1 ranked Defense in the FBS under defensive coordinator Don Brown, allowing just 254.4 yards per game, and allowing 10 or fewer points in 6 of their 12 games. However, on December 21, 2015, Jim Harbaugh convinced Brown to leave his position in Chestnut Hill and coach instead for the Michigan Wolverines football.

During the 2016 season the Eagles showed improvement from the previous year, finishing with a 7-6 overall record and a 2-6 ACC record after going winless in conference play the year before. This was Addazio's 3rd time in 4 seasons recording 7 wins with the Eagles. Boston College began their season in Dublin, Ireland, where they faced Georgia Tech football in the Emerald Isle Classic, and subsequently lost 17–14. After the season the Eagles were invited to play in the 2016 Quick Lane Bowl, where they defeated former ACC foe Maryland Terrapins football 36-30. Addazio coached his way yet another 7-6 overall record in the 2017 season, but continued increasing his conference win total by recording a 4-4 ACC record. The Eagles started the season 1-3, including losses to rivals Notre Dame football and Clemson football, causing fans to voice concern over Addazio's ability to lead the team to another bowl game. However, the Eagles finished the year with a 6-2 regular season record, highlighted by stellar play from freshman running back A. J. Dillon. Dillon had a breakout game on October 14, 2017, when the Eagles visited the Louisville Cardinals football and defeated them 45-42 on the road. Dillon posted 272 yards on 39 carries for 4 touchdowns, including a highlight reel stiff arm that led to a 75-yard touchdown. On October 27, 2017, the Eagles hosted the Florida State Seminoles football for the annual Welles Crowther Red Bandana game, winning by a score of 35-3. This marked the largest margin of victory in a Boston College win between the two schools. The next week the Eagles lost their starting quarterback, redshirt freshman Anthony Brown, to an ACL tear in a home loss to NC State Wolfpack football. However, the Eagles still won their final two regular season games, posting wins over rival programs Uconn Huskies football and Syracuse Orange football. Boston College was again invited to the Pinstripe Bowl, where they lost to Iowa 20-27. Following the season, A. J. Dillon was awarded both the ACC Rookie of the Year and the ACC Offensive Rookie of the Year awards, following his 1,589 yard, 14 touchdown campaign. This was the first time in school history that either award had been won.

Heading into the 2018 season, Addazio's team received the most media coverage they had seen in years. In fact, ESPN picked them as the team most likely to hit their pre-season predicted win total (6.5), which they eventually did. The reason for this new wave of excitement on Chestnut Hill was clear: Eagles had finished the previous season winning 6 of their final 9 games, and were returning all but 1 defensive starter. The Eagles started the season 3-0, with wins over UMass Minutemen football, long time rival Holy Cross football, and ACC rival Wake Forest Demon Deacons football. This hot start, combined with the pre-season media attention, found the Eagles back in the AP's Top 25 for the first time since the 2008 season, as they were ranked No. 23. However, BC fell out of the rankings as quickly as they entered, as they were beaten 13-30 by a previously winless Purdue team on the road the following week. The Eagles showed resilience, bouncing back from a close loss to NC State Wolfpack football, by beating ACC opponents Louisville Cardinals football and Miami Hurricanes football. Following their win over the Hurricanes, the BC found themselves back in the Top 25, ranked No. 24, as they headed to Blacksburg, VA to face longtime rival Virginia Tech football. Following a 31-21 victory, their 7th of the season, Boston College was chosen to host College GameDay (football TV program) before their home contest against undefeated Clemson football, the first time College GameDay had been to Chestnut Hill since 2009. BC rose to No. 17 in the AP poll following the Clemson game. Yet, the Eagles fell to eventual National Champion Clemson 7-27, after their starting quarterback Anthony Brown was injured on the Eagle's first possession. Steve Addazio and his team were unable to break the 7 win mark, as they lost the last two games of the regular season, including a loss to Florida State football following a Hail Mary in the final 2 minutes of the game. After the season, Boston College was invited to the 2018 First Responder Bowl in Dallas, Texas, where they were set to face No. 25 Boise State football. The Eagles came out strong, scoring first to take a 7-0 lead. However, due to poor weather conditions in Dallas, the game was ultimately canceled, causing coach Addazio to stay at 7 wins. Boston College finished the season with a 7-5 record (4-4 ACC). Despite his injury, A. J. Dillon posted another 1,000+ season, the first time in program history a player had recorded back-to-back 1,000 seasons.

BC then said goodbye to one of their most successful senior classes in program history, as 4 players were selected in the 7 round 2019 NFL Draft, including the 14th overall pick Chris Lindstrom. This marked the 3rd time in school history that 4+ players were selected in the NFL Draft, following 2014 and 1995. Additionally, 10 other BC players signed Unsigned Free Agent (UFA) contracts with NFL teams, a testament to the Player Development abilities by the BC coaching staff. Boston College fired Addazio on December 1, 2019 after a 6–6 season and a 44–44 record over 7 seasons.

Jeff Hafley era (2020–present)
On December 14, 2019, Jeff Hafley, the co-defensive coordinator and secondary coach at Ohio State, was named the 36th BC head coach. Hafley finished his first season at Boston College with a 6–5 record (5–5 ACC) and qualified for a Bowl game berth; however, the team chose to opt-out of the postseason amid the risks of the COVID-19 pandemic. In 2021 they went 6-6 (2-6 ACC) and would have played East Carolina in the Military Bowl, it was however cancelled the day before it was set to play due to a large number of COVID-19 cases in the Eagles' program.

Conference affiliations
 Independent (1892–1972)
 Division I Independent (1973–1977)
 Division I-A Independent (1978–1990)
 Big East Conference (1991–2004)
 Atlantic Coast Conference (2005–present)

Championships

National championships
Perhaps the best football team in Boston College history, the undefeated 1940 Eagles (11-0) won the 1941 Sugar Bowl over previously unbeaten No. 4 Tennessee. The school claims this year as a national championship. However, the team was not chosen by any NCAA-designated "major selectors" of national championships and does not appear in the NCAA records book.

Eastern and Conference championships
For much of its history, Boston College played as an independent, as did the majority of what are now labeled as Division I FBS football-playing schools located in the Northeast and Mid-Atlantic regions. During this time, Eastern Championships were named by independent third-party selectors and awarded of various trophies. The process of picking an Eastern Champion eventually came to be symbolized by the Lambert-Meadowlands Trophy awarded by the New Jersey Sports and Exposition Authority beginning in 1936. As a result, the Lambert-Meadowlands Trophy, voted on by a panel of sports writers in New York, became the de facto conference championship for those schools.

In 1991, the majority of football independents in the East (including Boston College) aligned themselves together in the Big East Football Conference. The Big East first crowned an official champion in 1993. The Eagles left the Big East and joined the Atlantic Coast Conference (ACC) in 2005.

† Co-champions

Division championships

Divisional play began in the Atlantic Coast Conference at the start of the 2005 football season following BC's inclusion in the conference. BC earned a share of the ACC Atlantic Division title in 2005 and in 2008. Florida State represented the division in the inaugural ACC Championship Game by virtue of the head-to-head tiebreaker in 2005, while BC represented the Atlantic in 2008.

† Co-champions

Bowl games

Boston College has been to 27 bowl games, holding a 14–12 record (the 2018 First Responder Bowl started but was delayed in the first quarter and ultimately canceled). Additionally, they accepted an invitation to the 2021 Military Bowl, however it was cancelled the day before it was set to be played due to COVID-19 cases in the Boston College program. The Eagles posted an 8-game bowl winning streak from 2000 to 2007 and went to 12 consecutive bowl games from 1999 to 2010. BC's 8-game bowl win streak was the nation's longest active streak before it was snapped in 2008. The 12-year streak was tied with Oklahoma for the 6th longest active streak in country. The Eagles recently broke their 5 bowl-game losing streak in 2016 with a 36–30 victory over former ACC foe Maryland.

Head coaches
List of Boston College head coaches.

Alumni Stadium

Since 1957, Alumni Stadium in Chestnut Hill, Massachusetts has been the home of the Eagles. Located on BC's lower campus, the stadium has a capacity of 44,500. Prior to 1957, the Eagles played home games at Boston's Fenway Park and Braves Field.

In 2005, the Yawkey Athletics Center was constructed at the north end-zone side of the stadium. The Yawkey Center houses the football offices and weight room. A replica of Doug Flutie's 1984 Heisman Trophy is on display in the BC football museum on the first floor of the Center.

Rivalries

Virginia Tech

BC and Virginia Tech first played in 1993 and have played every year since, except for 2004. Now both in the ACC, the two schools play each other every year despite not being in the same division.

The schools played each other twice in the same season in both 2007 and 2008; in both years, the Eagles won the regular season meeting while the Hokies won the rematch in the ACC Championship Game.

Virginia Tech is famed for its seeming invincibility in Thursday night games at Lane Stadium. Since 1994, the Hokies are 11–3 at home on Thursday nights. The Eagles delivered 2 of those 3 losses and until 2009 were the only team to beat Virginia Tech at Lane Stadium on a Thursday night. The 2007 Thursday night meeting between the Eagles and Hokies was undoubtedly the most exciting game of the rivalry. Matt Ryan led the No. 2 Eagles to an improbable comeback, scoring 2 TDs in the final 2:11 of the game to give BC a 14–10 victory over the No. 8 Virginia Tech.

Virginia Tech leads the all-time series 19–11 as of the 2021 season.

Clemson

The Eagles and Clemson Tigers first played each other in the Cotton Bowl at the end of the 1939 season, a game won by the Tigers. The schools played 11 more times until 1960. When BC joined the ACC in 2005, the games between the Eagles and the Tigers were especially memorable. Both the 2005 and 2006 games went to overtime and the 2007 game featured late-game heroics from Matt Ryan in a division-clinching victory.

Starting in 2008, the Boston College Gridiron Club created the O'Rourke-McFadden Trophy to honor the friendly rivalry between the Eagles and the Tigers. The trophy is named after BC's Charlie O'Rourke and Clemson's Banks McFadden, star players of their respective teams when the Eagles and Tigers first played in the 1940 Cotton Bowl. The MVP of the game receives a replica leather helmet. Montel Harris was named the MVP of the 2010 meeting.

Clemson leads the all-time series 20–9–2 as of the 2021 season.

UMass

BC and UMass are in-state rivals. The first game played between the two schools took place in 1899 and was played at a neutral location. Boston College won 18–0. At the time, UMass was known as Massachusetts Agricultural College. The relative proximity between the schools encouraged them to schedule additional matches in the subsequent years.

BC and UMass met again in Amherst, Massachusetts in 1901, 1902, and 1912, with UMass winning all three contests before the series was halted. The two universities did not meet again on the football field until 1966, when they began a seventeen-year series in which the teams would play each other in the last week of UMass' football season. UMass was in a lower division than BC during the entirety of the rivalry. As such, Boston College dominated the stretch, winning 15 of the 17 games, routinely blowing out the overmatched Minutemen.

After 22 years, the rivalry was renewed as UMass traveled to Chestnut Hill, Massachusetts to play Boston College once again. UMass was yet again outmatched, losing 29–7. The universities agreed to play two more times over the next seven years, and Boston College won both games easily.

In April 2011, UMass announced plans to join the Mid-American Conference and move up to the NCAA Football Bowl Subdivision, the highest level of college football in the country. Boston College had been a member of this division for decades, and there was much speculation that the two schools may cultivate a renewal of the rivalry. This was confirmed when it was reported in September, 2011, that they had agreed to play a three-game biannual series beginning in 2014. Two of the games will be played at BC's Alumni Stadium and the other will be held at Gillette Stadium.

Boston College is on a 11-game winning streak vs UMass, dating back to 1979, after beating the Minutemen 45–28 in the 2021 season, and they lead the all-time series 22–5.

Notre Dame

In recent years, Notre Dame has become one of BC's football rivals. Today, ND is the only other Catholic university playing NCAA Division I FBS football. The match up was dubbed the "Holy War" in 1975, and has acquired a number of other nicknames over the years. The two teams battle for the Frank Leahy Memorial Bowl and the Ireland Trophy.

The Eagles and the Fighting Irish have met once in the postseason; Notre Dame defeated Boston College in the 1983 Liberty Bowl by a score of 19–18. Boston College will host in 2025, 2030, and 2033, and Notre Dame will host in 2028 and 2035.

Notre Dame leads the all-time series 18–9 as of the 2022 season.

Syracuse

With the exception of Holy Cross, no team has played Boston College more than the Syracuse Orange. The teams first played in 1924 and started playing an annual game in 1961. In 2004, the Eagles last year in the Big East, the Orange pulled off a surprising upset that kept the Eagles from going to their first BCS game. BC's departure from the Big East put the future of the rivalry in doubt. However, the Eagles and the Orange agreed to play an annual out-of-conference game through 2021. In 2010, the Eagles won the first meeting between the schools since 2004 by a score of 16–7. In September 2011, the ACC announced that they had accepted bids by Syracuse and Pitt to become the 13th and 14th members of the ACC. Syracuse's admission into the ACC in 2013 reignited this storied rivalry. In both school's final regular season game, Boston College had a chance to return the favor from 2004, and prevent the 5-6 Orange from becoming bowl-eligible. Despite the Eagles taking a 31-27 lead with nearly 2 minutes and no time-outs remaining, Syracuse managed to score a touchdown with 6 seconds left, sealing the win and their 6th of the season, becoming the 11th ACC bowl-eligible team of the year. The Eagles returned the favor the following year, winning a 28–7 contest in Chestnut Hill on senior day.

, Syracuse leads the all-time series 33–22.

Holy Cross

Boston College and Holy Cross have a dormant rivalry dating back to 1896, and have met 83 times on the field. The game was an annual home-and-home series until 1986. The Eagles dominated the last two decades of the annual series, winning 17 out of 19 meetings from 1967–1986. The rivalry was recently renewed in 2018 as the Eagles handily won a 62–14 victory at Chestnut Hill; a 2020 matchup was scheduled to take place but was canceled due to the COVID-19 pandemic.

Villanova
Boston College and Villanova have a dormant rivalry. The two Catholic universities met 46 times, and played a home-and-home series from 1945 to 1980 (save 1954), until Villanova disbanded their 1-A program. They last met in 2013 with Villanova as an FCS opponent for the Eagles, with Boston College taking the 24–14 victory at Chestnut Hill.

Awards and honors

Individual award winners

Heisman Trophy
Doug Flutie – 1984
Maxwell Award
Doug Flutie – 1984
Walter Camp Award
Doug Flutie – 1984
Davey O'Brien Award
Doug Flutie – 1984
Outland Trophy
Mike Ruth – 1985
Johnny Unitas Golden Arm Award
Matt Ryan – 2007
Manning Award
Matt Ryan – 2007

Disney's Wide World of Sports Spirit Award
Mark Herzlich – 2009
Butkus Award
Luke Kuechly – 2011
Lombardi Award
Luke Kuechly – 2011
Lott Trophy
Luke Kuechly – 2011
Bronko Nagurski Trophy
Luke Kuechly – 2011
Doak Walker Award
Andre Williams – 2013

Consensus All-Americans

Boston College has had 12 consensus All-Americans.

Luke Urban – 1920
Gene Goodreault – 1940
Mike Holovak – 1942
Doug Flutie – 1984
Tony Thurman – 1984
Mike Ruth – 1985
Pete Mitchell – 1994
Mike Cloud – 1998
William Green – 2001
Jamie Silva – 2007
Luke Kuechly – 2010, 2011
Andre Williams – 2013

Doug Flutie ('84), Luke Kuechly ('10), and Andre Williams ('13) were all unanimous selections.

Individual honors

Retired numbers

Honored jerseys 
The Eagles have retired eleven jerseys in addition to Flutie's and Ruth's retired numbers: 

Art Donovan (1946–49)
Bill Flynn (1936–38)
Gene Goodreault (1938–40)
Mike Holovak (1940–42)
Luke Kuechly (2009–11)
Pete Mitchell (1991–94) 
Lou Montgomery (1937–40)
Charlie O'Rourke (1938–40)
Matt Ryan (2004–07)
Tony Thurman (1981–85)
Luke Urban (1916–17, 1919–20)

College Football Hall of Fame
Seven former BC players and three former coaches have been inducted into the College Football Hall of Fame. Five players from the 1940 "Team of Destiny", as well as the coach, are among the inductees. (Year Inducted)

Conference honors

Big East Offensive Player of the Year
Glenn Foley – 1993
Big East Defensive Player of the Year
Mathias Kiwanuka – 2004
Big East Rookie of the Year
Brian Toal – 2004
ACC Player of the Year
Matt Ryan – 2007
ACC Offensive Player of the Year
Matt Ryan – 2007

ACC Defensive Player of the Year
Mark Herzlich – 2008
Luke Kuechly – 2011
ACC Rookie of the Year
A. J. Dillon – 2017
ACC Offensive Rookie of the Year
A. J. Dillon – 2017
ACC Defensive Rookie of the Year
Luke Kuechly – 2009
ACC Jacobs Blocking Trophy
Josh Beekman – 2006
Brian Piccolo Award
Mark Herzlich – 2010

Eagles in the NFL

Since 2000, the Eagles have had 36 players selected in the NFL Draft. Of those picks, 9 were first round selections. BC had consecutive top 10 picks in 2008 and 2009; Matt Ryan was selected 3rd overall by the Atlanta Falcons in 2008 and B. J. Raji was selected 9th overall by the Green Bay Packers in 2009. Luke Kuechly has been the most recent Eagle stand-out in the NFL, selected by the Carolina Panthers with the 9th overall pick in the 2012 NFL Draft. Zion Johnson was the most recent player to be selected in the 1st round, after being chosen by the Los Angeles Chargers with the 17th overall pick in the 2022 NFL Draft.

"O-Line U"
The Eagles have a reputation of producing high-quality NFL Offensive Linemen, earning the school the nickname "O-Line U". Notable alums of O-Line U include Tom Nalen '93 (5x Pro Bowl Selection, 2x Super Bowl Champion), Ron Stone '92 (3x Pro Bowl Selection, 2x Super Bowl Champion), Damien Woody '98 (1x Pro Bowl Selection, 2x Super Bowl Champion), Dan Koppen '02 (1x Pro Bowl Selection, 2x Super Bowl Champion), and Chris Snee '03 (3x Pro Bowl Selection, 2x Super Bowl Champion).

Notable players

Future non-conference opponents
Announced schedules as of March 23, 2022.

See also
 Lambert-Meadowlands Trophy

References

External links

 

 
American football teams established in 1892
1892 establishments in Massachusetts